Professor Soul is an album by organist Charles Kynard which was recorded in 1968 and released on the Prestige label.

Reception

Allmusic awarded the album 4½ stars calling it "This 1968 gem".

Track listing 
All compositions by Charles Kynard except as indicated
 "Professor Soul" - 6:47   
 "Cristo Redentor" (Duke Pearson) - 4:34   
 "Song of Delilah" (Jay Livingston, Ray Evans, Victor Young) - 6:45   
 "Sister Lovie" (Johnny Kirkwood, J. Allen) - 5:42   
 "By The Time I Get to Phoenix" (Jimmy Webb) - 7:50   
 "J.C" - 5:27

Personnel 
Charles Kynard - organ
Cal Green - guitar
Johnny Kirkwood - drums

References 

Charles Kynard albums
1968 albums
Prestige Records albums
Albums produced by Bob Porter (record producer)